A role-playing game system is a set of game mechanics used in a tabletop role-playing game (TTRPG) to determine the outcome of a character's in-game actions.

History
By the late 1970s, the Chaosium staff realized that Steve Perrin's RuneQuest system had the potential to become a "house system", where one set of game mechanics could be used for multiple games; Greg Stafford and Lynn Willis proved that theory by boiling down the RuneQuest rules into the thin 16-page Basic Role-Playing (1980). Hero Games used their Champions rules as the basis for their Hero System. The Pacesetter house system centered on a universal "action table" that used one chart to resolve all game actions. Steve Jackson became interested in publishing a new roleplaying system, designed by himself, with three goals: that it be detailed and realistic; logical and well-organized; and adaptable to any setting and any level of play; this system was eventually released as GURPS (1986). The D&D-derived Palladium house system ultimately encompassed all of the Palladium Books titles. Mekton II (1987) by R. Talsorian Games revealed for the first time the full-fledged Interlock System.

In 1990, Game Designers' Workshop released the Twilight: 2000 second edition game system, and decided to turn it into their house system, an umbrella under which all future games would be designed. TSR's Amazing Engine was a universal game system, a simple beginner's system. In 1996, Hero Games partnered with R. Talsorian and decided to create a new, simpler rules system to attract new players, merging it with the Interlock game system and calling it Fuzion. Dragonlance: Fifth Age (1996) was built on TSR's new SAGA storytelling game system, which centered on resource management (through cards) rather than die rolls. TSR published Alternity (1997), another universal system, this one directed only toward science-fiction games. West End Games' MasterBook system had failed to catch on as a house system, so they decided to publish another, the D6 System, based on their most well-known and well-tested game system, Star Wars RPG.

Development
While early role-playing games relied heavily on either group consensus or the judgement of a single player (the "Dungeon Master" or Game Master) or on randomizers such as dice, later generations of narrativist games allow role-playing to influence the creative input and output of the players, so both acting out roles and employing rules take part in shaping the outcome of the game.

An RPG system also affects the game environment, which can take any of several forms. Generic role-playing game systems, such as Basic Role-Playing, GURPS, and Fate, are not tied to a specific storytelling genre or campaign setting and can be used as a framework to play many different types of RPG.  Others, such as Dungeons & Dragons, are designed to depict a specific genre or style of play, and still others, such as Paranoia, are not only genre-specific but come bundled with a specific campaign setting to which the game mechanics are inseparably tied.  In fact, in more psychological games such as Call of Cthulhu, King Arthur Pendragon, Unknown Armies, and Don't Rest Your Head, aspects of the game system are designed to reinforce psychological or emotional dynamics that evoke a game world's specific atmosphere.

Many role-playing game systems involve the generation of random numbers by which success or failure of an action is determined.  This can be done using dice (probably the most common method) or cards (as in Castle Falkenstein), but other methods may be used depending on the system. The random result is added to an attribute which is then compared to a difficulty rating, although many variations on this game mechanic exist among systems. Some (such as the Storyteller/Storytelling System and the One-Roll Engine) use dice pools instead of individual dice to generate a series of random numbers, some of which may be discarded or used to determine the magnitude of the result.  However, some games (such as the Amber Diceless Roleplaying Game and Nobilis) use no random factor at all. These instead use direct comparison of character ability scores to difficulty values, often supplemented with points from a finite but renewable pool.  These "resource points" represent a character's additional effort or luck, and can be used strategically by the player to influence the success of an action.

References